Patriarchy is a social system in which positions of dominance and privilege are primarily held by men. It is used, both as a technical anthropological term for families or clans controlled by the father or eldest male or group of males and in feminist theory where it is used to describe broad social structures in which men dominate over women and children. In these theories it is often extended to a variety of manifestations in which men have social privileges over others causing exploitation or oppression, such as through male dominance of moral authority and control of property. Patriarchal societies can be patrilineal or matrilineal, meaning that property and title are inherited by the male or female lineage respectively.

Patriarchy is associated various ideas forming patriarchal ideology that acts to explain and justify it and attributes it to inherent natural differences between men and women, devine commanded or other fixed structures. Sociologists hold varied opinions on whether patriarchy is a social product or an outcome of innate differences between the sexes. Sociobiologists compare human gender roles to sexed behavior in other primates and some argue that gender inequality comes primarily from genetic and reproductive differences between men and women. Social constructionists contest this argument, arguing that gender roles and gender inequity are instruments of power and have become social norms to maintain control over women.

Historically, patriarchy has manifested itself in the social, legal, political, religious, and economic organization of a range of different cultures. Most contemporary societies are, in practice, patriarchal.

Etymology and usage

Historically, the term patriarchy has been used to refer to autocratic rule by the male head of a family; however, since the late 20th century it has also been used to refer to social systems in which power is primarily held by adult men. The term was particularly used by writers associated with second-wave feminism such as Kate Millett; these writers sought to use an understanding of patriarchal social relations to liberate women from male domination. This concept of patriarchy was developed to explain male dominance as a social, rather than biological, phenomenon.

History

Pre-history
The first evidence of patriarchal structures are pointed to, by some researchers, to be placed deep in human evolutionary past at the first signs of sexual division of labour which happened, about 2 million years ago. Other  anthropological, archaeological and evolutionary psychological evidence suggests that most prehistoric societies were relatively egalitarian, and suggests that patriarchal social structures did not develop until after the end of the Pleistocene epoch, following social and technological developments such as agriculture and domestication. According to Robert M. Strozier, historical research has not yet found a specific "initiating event". Gerda Lerner asserts that there was no single event, and documents that patriarchy as a social system arose in different parts of the world at different times. Some scholars point to social and technological events about six thousand years ago (4000 BCE), while others suggest an evolutionary process during a period of resource scarcity in Africa approximately 2 million years ago as the origin of fatherhood, and the beginning of the of patriarchy.

Marxist theory, as articulated mainly by Friedrich Engels in The Origin of the Family, Private Property and the State, assigns the origin of patriarchy to the emergence of private property, which has traditionally been controlled by men. In this view, men directed household production and sought to control women in order to ensure the passing of family property to their own (male) offspring, while women were limited to household labor and producing children. Lerner disputes this idea, arguing that patriarchy emerged before the development of class-based society and the concept of private property.

Domination by men of women is found in the Ancient Near East as far back as 3100 BCE, as are restrictions on a woman's reproductive capacity and exclusion from "the process of representing or the construction of history". According to some researchers, with the appearance of the Hebrews, there is also "the exclusion of woman from the God-humanity covenant".

The archaeologist Marija Gimbutas argues that waves of kurgan-building invaders from the Ukrainian steppes into the early agricultural cultures of Old Europe in the Aegean, the Balkans and southern Italy instituted male hierarchies that led to the rise of patriarchy in Western society. Steven Taylor argues that the rise of patriarchal domination was associated with the appearance of socially stratified hierarchical polities, institutionalised violence and the separated individuated ego associated with a period of climatic stress.

In the book Catching Fire: How Cooking Made Us Human British primatologist Richard Wrangham suggests that the origin of the division of labor between males and females may have originated with the invention of cooking,   which is estimated to have happened simultaneously with humans gaining control of fire between 1 and 2 million years ago. The idea was early proposed by Friedrich Engels in an unfinished essay from 1876.

Ancient history
A prominent Greek general Meno, in the Platonic dialogue of the same name, sums up the prevailing sentiment in Classical Greece about the respective virtues of men and women. He says:

The works of Aristotle portrayed women as morally, intellectually, and physically inferior to men; saw women as the property of men; claimed that women's role in society was to reproduce and to serve men in the household; and saw male domination of women as natural and virtuous.

Gerda Lerner, author of The Creation of Patriarchy, states that Aristotle believed that women had colder blood than men, which made women not evolve into men, the sex that Aristotle believed to be perfect and superior. Maryanne Cline Horowitz stated that Aristotle believed that "soul contributes the form and model of creation". This implies that any imperfection that is caused in the world must be caused by a woman because one cannot acquire an imperfection from perfection (which he perceived as male). Aristotle had a hierarchical ruling structure in his theories. Lerner claims that through this patriarchal belief system, passed down generation to generation, people have been conditioned to believe that men are superior to women. These symbols are benchmarks which children learn about when they grow up, and the cycle of patriarchy continues much past the Greeks.

Egypt left no philosophical record, but Herodotus left a record of his shock at the contrast between the roles of Egyptian women and the women of Athens. He observed that Egyptian women attended market and were employed in trade. In ancient Egypt, middle-class women were eligible to sit on a local tribunal, engage in real estate transactions, and inherit or bequeath property. Women also secured loans, and witnessed legal documents. Athenian women were denied such rights.

Greek influence spread, however, with the conquests of Alexander the Great, who was educated by Aristotle.

During this time period in China, gender roles and patriarchy remained shaped by Confucianism. Adopted as the official religion in the Han dynasty, Confucianism has strong dictates regarding the behavior of women, declaring a woman's place in society, as well as outlining virtuous behavior. Three Obediences and Four Virtues, a Confucian text, places a woman's value on her loyalty and obedience. It explains that an obedient woman is to obey their father before her marriage, her husband after marriage, and her first son if widowed, and that a virtuous woman must practice sexual propriety, proper speech, modest appearance, and hard work. Ban Zhao, a Confucian disciple, writes in her book Precepts for Women, that a woman's primary concern is to subordinate themselves before patriarchal figures such as a husband or father, and that they need not concern themselves with intelligence or talent. Ban Zhao is considered by some historians as an early champion for women's education in China, however her extensive writing on the value of a woman's mediocrity and servile behavior leaves others feeling that this narrative is the result of a misplaced desire to cast her in a contemporary feminist light. Similarly to Three Obediences and Four Virtues, Precepts for Women was meant as a moral guide for proper feminine behavior, and was widely accepted as such for centuries.

Post-classical history

In China's Ming Dynasty, widowed women were expected to never remarry, and unmarried women were expected to remain chaste for the duration of their lives. Biographies of Exemplary Women, a book containing biographies of women who lived according to the Confucian ideals of virtuous womanhood, popularized an entire genre of similar writing during the Ming dynasty. Women who lived according to this Neo-Confucian ideal were celebrated in official documents, and some had structures erected in their honor.

In ancient Japan, power in society was more evenly distributed, particularly in the religious domain, where Shintoism worships the goddess Amaterasu, and ancient writings were replete with references to great priestesses and magicians. However, at the time contemporary with Constantine in the West, "the emperor of Japan changed Japanese modes of worship", giving supremacy to male deities and suppressing female spiritual power in what religious feminists have called a "patriarchal revolution."

Modern history
Although many 16th and 17th century theorists agreed with Aristotle's views concerning the place of women in society, none of them tried to prove political obligation on the basis of the patriarchal family until sometime after 1680. The patriarchal political theory is closely associated with Sir Robert Filmer. Sometime before 1653, Filmer completed a work entitled Patriarcha. However, it was not published until after his death. In it, he defended the divine right of kings as having title inherited from Adam, the first man of the human species, according to Judeo-Christian tradition.

However, in the latter half of the 18th century, clerical sentiments of patriarchy were meeting challenges from intellectual authorities – Diderot's Encyclopedia denies inheritance of paternal authority stating, "... reason shows us that mothers have rights and authority equal to those of fathers; for the obligations imposed on children originate equally from the mother and the father, as both are equally responsible for bringing them into the world. Thus the positive laws of God that relate to the obedience of children join the father and the mother without any differentiation; both possess a kind of ascendancy and jurisdiction over their children...."

In the 19th century, various women began to question the commonly accepted patriarchal interpretation of Christian scripture. Quaker Sarah Grimké voiced skepticism about the ability of men to translate and interpret passages relating to the roles of the sexes without bias. She proposed alternative translations and interpretations of passages relating to women, and she applied historical and cultural criticism to a number of verses, arguing that their admonitions applied to specific historical situations, and were not to be viewed as universal commands.

Elizabeth Cady Stanton used Grimké's criticism of biblical sources to establish a basis for feminist thought. She published The Woman's Bible, which proposed a feminist reading of the Old and New Testament. This tendency was enlarged by feminist theory, which denounced the patriarchal Judeo-Christian tradition. In 2020 social theorist and theologian Elaine Storkey retold the stories of thirty biblical women in her book Women in a Patriarchal World and applied the challenges they faced to women today. Working from both the Hebrew Scriptures and the New Testament, she analysed different variations of patriarchy, and outlined the paradox of Rahab, a prostitute in the Old Testament who became a role-model in the New Testament Epistle of James, and Epistle to the Hebrews. In his essay, A Judicial Patriarchy: Family Law at the Turn of the Century, Michael Grossberg coined the phrase judicial patriarchy stating that, "The judge became the buffer between the family and the state" and that, "Judicial patriarchs dominated family law because within these institutional and intraclass rivalries judges succeeded in protecting their power over the law governing the hearth.

The sociologist Sylvia Walby defines patriarchy as "a system of social structures and practices in which men dominate, oppress, and exploit women". Social stratification along gender lines, with power predominantly held by men, has been observed in most societies.

In China's Qing dynasty, laws governing morality, sexuality, and gender-relations continued to be based on Confucian teachings. Men and women were both subject to strict laws regarding sexual behavior, however men were punished infrequently in comparison to women. Additionally, women's punishment often carried strong social stigma, "rendering [women] unmarriageable", a stigma which did not follow men. Similarly, in the People's Republic of China, laws governing morality which were written as egalitarian were selectively enforced favoring men, permissively allowing female infanticide, while infanticide of any form was, by the letter of the law, prohibited.

Feminist theory
Feminist theorists have written extensively about patriarchy either as a primary cause of women's oppression, or as part of an interactive system. Shulamith Firestone, a radical-libertarian feminist, defines patriarchy as a system of oppression of women. Firestone believes that patriarchy is caused by the biological inequalities between women and men, e.g. that women bear children, while men do not. Firestone writes that patriarchal ideologies support the oppression of women and gives as an example the joy of giving birth, which she labels a patriarchal myth. For Firestone, women must gain control over reproduction in order to be free from oppression. Feminist historian Gerda Lerner believes that male control over women's sexuality and reproductive functions is a fundamental cause and result of patriarchy. Alison Jaggar also understands patriarchy as the primary cause of women's oppression. The system of patriarchy accomplishes this by alienating women from their bodies.

Interactive systems theorists Iris Marion Young and Heidi Hartmann believe that patriarchy and capitalism interact together to oppress women. Young, Hartmann, and other socialist and Marxist feminists use the terms patriarchal capitalism or capitalist patriarchy to describe the interactive relationship of capitalism and patriarchy in producing and reproducing the oppression of women. According to Hartmann, the term patriarchy redirects the focus of oppression from the labour division to a moral and political responsibility liable directly to men as a gender. In its being both systematic and universal, therefore, the concept of patriarchy represents an adaptation of the Marxist concept of class and class struggle.

Lindsey German represents an outlier in this regard. German argued for a need to redefine the origins and sources of the patriarchy, describing the mainstream theories as providing "little understanding of how women's oppression and the nature of the family have changed historically. Nor is there much notion of how widely differing that oppression is from class to class." Instead, the patriarchy is not the result of men's oppression of women or sexism per se, with men not even identified as the main beneficiaries of such a system, but capital itself. As such, female liberation needs to begin "with an assessment of the material position of women in capitalist society."

Audre Lorde, an African American feminist writer and theorist, believed that racism and patriarchy were intertwined systems of oppression. Sara Ruddick, a philosopher who wrote about "good mothers" in the context of maternal ethics, describes the dilemma facing contemporary mothers who must train their children within a patriarchal system. She asks whether a "good mother" trains her son to be competitive, individualistic, and comfortable within the hierarchies of patriarchy, knowing that he may likely be economically successful but a mean person, or whether she resists patriarchal ideologies and socializes her son to be cooperative and communal but economically unsuccessful.

Gerda Lerner, in her 1986 The Creation of Patriarchy, makes a series of arguments about the origins and reproduction of patriarchy as a system of oppression of women, and concludes that patriarchy is socially constructed and seen as natural and invisible.

Some feminist theorists believe that patriarchy is an unjust social system that is harmful to both men and women. It often includes any social, political, or economic mechanism that evokes male dominance over women. Because patriarchy is a social construction, it can be overcome by revealing and critically analyzing its manifestations.

Jaggar, Young, and Hartmann are among the feminist theorists who argue that the system of patriarchy should be completely overturned, especially the heteropatriarchal family, which they see as a necessary component of female oppression. The family not only serves as a representative of the greater civilization by pushing its own affiliates to change and obey, but performs as a component in the rule of the patriarchal state that rules its inhabitants with the head of the family.

Many feminists (especially scholars and activists) have called for culture repositioning as a method for deconstructing patriarchy. Culture repositioning relates to culture change. It involves the reconstruction of the cultural concept of a society. Prior to the widespread use of the term patriarchy, early feminists used male chauvinism and sexism to refer roughly to the same phenomenon. Author bell hooks argues that the new term identifies the ideological system itself (that men claim dominance and superiority to women) that can be believed and acted upon by either men or women, whereas the earlier terms imply only men act as oppressors of women.

Sociologist Joan Acker, analyzing the concept of patriarchy and the role that it has played in the development of feminist thought, says that seeing patriarchy as a "universal, trans-historical and trans-cultural phenomenon" where "women were everywhere oppressed by men in more or less the same ways […] tended toward a biological essentialism."

Anna Pollert has described use of the term patriarchy as circular and conflating description and explanation. She remarks the discourse on patriarchy creates a "theoretical impasse ... imposing a structural label on what it is supposed to explain" and therefore impoverishes the possibility of explaining gender inequalities.

Biological theory

Studies of male sexual coercion and female resistance in nonhuman primates (for example, chimpanzees) suggest that sexual conflicts of interest underlying the patriarchy precede the emergence of the human species. However, the extent of male power over females varies greatly across different primate species. Among bonobos (a close relative of humans), for example, male coercion of females is rarely, if ever, observed, and bonobos are widely considered to be matriarchal in their social structure.

There is also considerable variation in the role that gender plays in human societies, and there is no academic consensus on to what extent biology determines human social structure.  The Encyclopædia Britannica states that "...many cultures bestow power preferentially on one sex or the other...." Some anthropologists, such as Floriana Ciccodicola, have argued that patriarchy is a cultural universal, and the masculinities scholar David Buchbinder suggests that Roland Barthes' description of the term ex-nomination, i.e. patriarchy as the 'norm' or common sense, is relevant.  However, there do exist cultures that some anthropologists have described as matriarchal.  Among the Mosuo (a tiny society in the Yunnan Province in China), for example, women exert greater power, authority, and control over decision-making. Other societies are matrilinear or matrilocal, primarily among indigenous tribal groups. Some hunter-gatherer groups, such as the !Kung of southern Africa, have been characterized as largely egalitarian.

Some proponents of the biological determinist understanding of patriarchy argue that because of human female biology, women are more fit to perform roles such as anonymous child-rearing at home, rather than high-profile decision-making roles, such as leaders in battles. Through this basis, "the existence of a sexual division of labor in primitive societies is a starting point as much for purely social accounts of the origins of patriarchy as for biological." Hence, the rise of patriarchy is recognized through this apparent "sexual division".

Patriarchy as a human universal 
An early theory in evolutionary psychology offered an explanation for the origin of patriarchy which starts with the view that females almost always invest more energy into producing offspring than males, and, therefore in most species females are a limiting factor over which males will compete. This is sometimes referred to as Bateman's principle. It suggests females place the most important preference on males who control more resources that can help her and her offspring, which in turn causes an evolutionary pressure on males to be competitive with each other in order to gain resources and power.

Some sociobiologists, such as Steven Goldberg, argue that social behavior is primarily determined by genetics, and thus that patriarchy arises more as a result of inherent biology than social conditioning. Goldberg contends that patriarchy is a universal feature of human culture. In 1973, Goldberg wrote, "The ethnographic studies of every society that has ever been observed explicitly state that these feelings were present, there is literally no variation at all." Goldberg has critics among anthropologists. Concerning Goldberg's claims about the "feelings of both men and women", Eleanor Leacock countered in 1974 that the data on women's attitudes are "sparse and contradictory", and that the data on male attitudes about male–female relations are "ambiguous". Also, the effects of colonialism on the cultures represented in the studies were not considered.

Anthropologist and psychologist Barbara Smuts argues that patriarchy evolved in humans through conflict between the reproductive interests of males and the reproductive interests of females. She lists six ways that it emerged:
 a reduction in female allies
 elaboration of male-male alliances
 increased male control over resources
 increased hierarchy formation among men
 female strategies that reinforce male control over females
 the evolution of language and its power to create ideology.

Sex hormones and social structure 
Patriarchal and matriarchal social structure in primates may be mediated by sex hormones. Studies have found higher pre-natal testosterone or lower digit ratio to be correlated with sensation seeking, toy preference as well as higher aggression in human males.

In humans, patriarchal social structure may have evolved due to intersexual selection (i.e. female mate selection), or intrasexual selection (i.e. male-male competition).  Physical features associated with testosterone, such as facial hair and lower voices, are sometimes used to gain a better understanding of sexual pressures in the human evolutionary environment.  These features may have appeared as a result of female mate selection, or because of male-male competition. Men with beards and low voices are perceived as more dominant, aggressive, and high-status compared to their cleanshaven higher-voiced counterparts, meaning that men with facial hair and lower voices may be more likely to attain a high status and increase their reproductive success.

Male violence 

Psychologist and professor Mark van Vugt, from VU University at Amsterdam, Netherlands, has argued that human males have evolved more aggressive and group-oriented behavior in order to gain access to resources, territories, mates and higher status. His theory, the Male Warrior hypothesis, posits that males throughout hominid history have evolved to form coalitions or groups in order to engage in inter-group aggression and increase their chances of acquiring resources, mates and territory. Vugt argues that this evolved male social dynamic explains the human history of war to modern-day gang rivalry.
In modern society most crimes are committed by men.  Sociologist/criminologist Lee Ellis put forward an evolutionary explanation for male criminality known as the evolutionary neuroandrogenic (ENA) theory. Investigations of prison inmates generally show that the most brutal criminals have the most testosterone, compared with those who were serving sentences for more harmless crimes. Therefore, Ellis posits that the human male brain has evolved in such a way as to be competitive at the verge of risk and gangsterism is an example of an extreme form of male behavior.

Social theory

Sociologists tend to reject predominantly biological explanations of patriarchy and contend that socialization processes are primarily responsible for establishing gender roles. According to standard sociological theory, patriarchy is the result of sociological constructions that are passed down from generation to generation. These constructions are most pronounced in societies with traditional cultures and less economic development. Even in modern, developed societies, however, gender messages conveyed by family, mass media, and other institutions largely favor males having a dominant status.

Although patriarchy exists within the scientific atmosphere, "the periods over which women would have been at a physiological disadvantage in participation in hunting through being at a late stage of pregnancy or early stage of child-rearing would have been short", during the time of the nomads, patriarchy still grew with power. Lewontin and others argue that such biological determinism unjustly limits women. In his study, he states women behave a certain way not because they are biologically inclined to, but rather because they are judged by "how well they conform to the stereotypical local image of femininity".

Feminists believe that people have gendered biases, which are perpetuated and enforced across generations by those who benefit from them. For instance, it has historically been claimed that women cannot make rational decisions during their menstrual periods. This claim cloaks the fact that men also have periods of time where they can be aggressive and irrational; furthermore, unrelated effects of aging and similar medical problems are often blamed on menopause, amplifying its reputation. These biological traits and others specific to women, such as their ability to get pregnant, are often used against them as an attribute of weakness.

Sociologist Sylvia Walby has composed six overlapping structures that define patriarchy and that take different forms in different cultures and different times:
 The household: women are more likely to have their labor expropriated by their husbands such as through housework and raising children
 Paid work: women are likely to be paid less and face exclusion from paid work
 The state: women are unlikely to have formal power and representation
 Violence: women are more prone to being abused
 Sexuality: women's sexuality is more likely to be treated negatively
 Culture: representation of women in media, and popular culture is "within a patriarchal gaze".

The idea that patriarchy is natural has, however, come under attack from many sociologists, explaining that patriarchy evolved due to historical, rather than biological, conditions. In technologically simple societies, men's greater physical strength and women's common experience of pregnancy combined to sustain patriarchy.Gradually, technological advances, especially industrial machinery, diminished the primacy of physical strength in everyday life. Introduction of household appliances reduced the amount of manual labor needed in the households.  Similarly, contraception has given women control over their reproductive cycle.

Psychoanalytic theories
While the term patriarchy often refers to male domination generally, another interpretation sees it as literally "rule of the father". So some people believe patriarchy does not refer simply to of male power over women, but the expression of power dependent on age as well as gender, such as by older men over women, children, and younger men. Some of these younger men may inherit and therefore have a stake in continuing these conventions. Others may rebel.

This psychoanalytic model is based upon revisions of Freud's description of the normally neurotic family using the analogy of the story of Oedipus. Those who fall outside the Oedipal triad of mother/father/child are less subject to male authority.

The operations of power in such cases are usually enacted unconsciously. All are subject, even fathers are bound by its strictures. It is represented in unspoken traditions and conventions performed in everyday behaviors, customs, and habits. The triangular relationship of a father, a mother and an inheriting eldest son frequently form the dynamic and emotional narratives of popular culture and are enacted performatively in rituals of courtship and marriage. They provide conceptual models for organising power relations in spheres that have nothing to do with the family, for example, politics and business.

Arguing from this standpoint, radical feminist Shulamith Firestone wrote in her 1970 The Dialectic of Sex:

Marx was on to something more profound than he knew when he observed that the family contained within itself in embryo all the antagonisms that later develop on a wide scale within the society and the state. For unless revolution uproots the basic social organisation, the biological family – the vinculum through which the psychology of power can always be smuggled – the tapeworm of exploitation will never be annihilated.

See also

Patriarchal models
 Biblical patriarchy
 Chinese patriarchy
 Domostroy
 Pater familias

Related topics
 Androcentrism
 Capitalist Patriarchy and the Case for Socialist Feminism
 Correspondence principle (sociology)
 Family as a model for the state
 Family economics
 Feminism
 Gender role
 Hegemonic masculinity
 Heteropatriarchy
 Homemaker
 Male expendability
 Masculinity
 Nature versus nurture
 Patriarch (disambiguation)
 Patriarchate
 Patrilineality
 Patrilocal residence
 Phallocentrism
 Sociology of fatherhood
 The personal is political
 Tree of patriarchy
 Womb envy

Comparable social models
 Androcracy
 Kyriarchy
 Male privilege
 Matriarchy

Contrast
 Shared earning/shared parenting marriage

References

Further reading 

 
 
 
:Cited in:
 
 
 
  Pdf.

External links
 
 
 
 

 
Male
Cultural anthropology
 Family
 Fatherhood
 Gender and society
Men
Sociobiology
 Family economics
 Feminism and society
 Feminist terminology
Feminist theory
Political anthropology